The 1929 Five Nations Championship was the fifteenth series of the rugby union Five Nations Championship following the inclusion of France into the Home Nations Championship. Including the previous Home Nations Championships, this was the forty-second series of the annual northern hemisphere rugby union championship. Ten matches were played between 31 December 1928 and 1 April 1929. It was contested by England, France, Ireland, Scotland and Wales.

Table

Results

External links

1920
Five Nations
Five Nations
Five Nations
Five Nations
Five Nations
Five Nations
Five Nations Championship
Five Nations Championship
Five Nations Championship
Five Nations Championship
Five Nations Championship